Joseph Eduardo Johns is an American lawyer and journalist. He is the Senior Washington Correspondent for CNN, based in the Washington, D.C., bureau. He was promoted to the position in 2014. He previously worked as an NBC News Capitol Hill Correspondent for TODAY and other NBC programs. He worked for WRC-TV (NBC-4) in Washington, D.C.  He also worked as an anchor for WSAZ-TV in 1980.

In an interview with Capitol Standard magazine in 2016, Johns said of the lessons he's learned in media: "Be skeptical of hype. People who tell big lies don’t back down, even when confronted with the truth."

Johns was a star discus thrower at West High School in Columbus, Ohio. He was a four-year scholarship track and field athlete at Marshall University and was inducted into the Marshall University Athletics Hall of Fame in 2003. He holds a bachelor of arts degree in political science from Marshall University in Huntington, West Virginia, where he graduated Omicron Delta Kappa, and a J.D. degree from American University in D.C.

Johns was married to former MSNBC analyst Michelle Bernard;
the couple divorced in 2008.

References

External links

Living people
People from Columbus, Ohio
Washington College of Law alumni
Marshall University alumni
Marshall Thundering Herd men's track and field athletes
African-American journalists
American television reporters and correspondents
CNN people
Journalists from Ohio
Year of birth missing (living people)
21st-century African-American people